In relativistic laser-plasma physics the relativistic similarity parameter S is a dimensionless parameter defined as

,

Note that CGS units were used above.

The concept of similarity and the similarity parameter  were first introduced in plasma physics by Sergey Gordienko. It allows distinguishing between relativistically overdense  and underdense plasmas .

The similarity parameter is connected to basic symmetry properties of the collisionless Vlasov equation and is thus the relativistic plasma analog of the Reynolds number in fluid mechanics. The main result of the relativistic similarity theory can be summarized as follows: if the parameters of the interaction (plasma density and laser amplitude) change simultaneously so that the  parameter remains constant, the dynamics of the electrons remains the same.

The similarity theory allows deriving non-trivial power-law scalings for the energy of fast electrons in underdense and overdense plasmas.

References 

Plasma physics